Broadview is an unincorporated community located in Curry County, New Mexico, United States. Broadview has a post office with ZIP code 88112.

References

Unincorporated communities in Curry County, New Mexico
Unincorporated communities in New Mexico